Lionel Ravi (born 12 November 1985 in  Martinique) is a professional footballer who plays as a midfielder for Club Franciscain in the Martinique Championnat National and internationally for Martinique.

He played for CS Case-Pilote until joining Golden Lion in 2010.

In 2018, he was playing in France for ASPTT de Champigny sur Mare

He made his debut for Martinique in 2010. He was in the Martinique Gold Cup squad for the 2013 tournament.

References

1985 births
Living people
Martiniquais footballers
 Martinique international footballers
Association football midfielders